Lebogang Lelani Phiri (born 9 November 1994) is a South African professional footballer who plays for Ligue 2 club Paris FC on loan from Çaykur Rizespor and the South Africa national team. Phiri is capable of playing in several midfield positions, but is usually deployed by his club and national sides as a central midfielder, in the role of a deep-lying playmaker.

Career

Brøndby IF

2012–13 season
Phiri joined Brøndby IF's under-19 team on 8 February 2013 on a long-term eighteen months loan from the youth academy of South African side Bidvest Wits. He soon became a member of the first team, claiming a spot as a defensive midfielder in the line-up, due to injuries and suspensions. He made his debut (in jersey number 34) in the away game against OB on 28 April 2013 which was won 2–1. Phiri retained his spot for the remaining four games of the season in which Brøndby were undefeated while scoring twice. On 20 May 2013, he scored the last-minute winning goal against AC Horsens that made Brøndby avoid relegation from the Danish Superliga.

2013–14 season
Phiri signed 28 June 2013 a new four-year contract which tied him to the club until the summer 2017. He was officially promoted to the first team and handed jersey number 18.

He had a rough start on the season as Brøndby IF decided to sign Martin Ørnskov as an reinforcement and replacement for him in defensive midfield. But Phiri found himself in the starting line-up after three matches with only 1 point and thereby pushed the team captain Mikkel Thygesen away from the defensive midfield in Brøndby's 4–2–3–1 system in the 2–2 away draw against Viborg on 9 August 2013. But yet again Phiri found himself back on the bench as Brøndby IF signed former Danish international Thomas Kahlenberg. He returned to the starting line-up in November playing in a 3–0 home victory against Aarhus GF.

2014–15 season
On 31 July 2014, Phiri made his Europa League debut in the starting line-up in a 3–0 away defeat against Belgian side Club Brugge. Following a winter mid-season preparation with much playtime Phiri managed to settle as one of manager Thomas Frank's favourites which was rewarded with a call-up to the South Africa national team. He made his debut coming off the bench during the second half in the Bafana's 3–1 victory over Swaziland on 25 March 2015 which earned him a slot on the Wall of Honour at Brøndby Stadium.

2015–16 season
Phiri started the season with a slot among the starting-11 in a 9–0 home victory against San Marino side A.C. Juvenes/Dogana in the Europa League qualification.

Phiri chose a new agent, former Danish international Søren Lerby to represent him during the forthcoming career decisions and contract negotiations. On 20 March 2016, Phiri was named MoM by both sponsors and supporters after a performance against Esbjerg fB. Afterwards, he revealed that he felt ready to take the next step in his career while being open for a contract extension with Brøndby IF.

A week later, Phiri got his South Africa under-23 debut in the starting line-up in the 3–1 defeat against Brazil under-23 during the Olympic Games 2016 preparation before being substituted off during the half time break.

Phiri crowned his season by winning the leading Brøndby dedicated media 3point.dk player of the season award, a prize based on the readers' votes after each game in the season. He had twice as many points as the club legend Daniel Agger who came in third after Frederik Rønnow.

2016–17 season
During the pre-season Phiri represented South Africa U23 in the COSAFA Castle cup in Namibia where he started and led his team to a 3–2 win against Botswana. He scored his first U23 goal (2–1) in the 5–1 semi-final victory against Swaziland.

Phiri started contract negotiations with Brøndby after returning from COSAFA Castle Cup. Both the club and Phiri stated a common interest in an agreement but Phiri also said that he was keeping his options open. During the negotiations he revealed that Brøndby had rejected an offer from the Austria side Rapid Vienna. After weeks of negotiations Brøndby decided to put pressure on Phiri as they rejected his wish of representing his country at the Olympics 2016 in Rio without a signed contract extension.

On 28 May 2017, Brøndby announced that Phiri would leave the club at the end of his contract due to his ambition for a new challenge.

Guingamp
On 30 May 2017, EA Guingamp announced that Phiri had penned a four-year-contract tying him to the club until the summer 2021.

Çaykur Rizespor
Phiri joined Süper Lig club Çaykur Rizespor on a three-year contract in July 2021.

Loan to Paris FC
On 29 June 2022, Çaykur Rizespor announced Phiri's loan to Paris FC for the 2022–23 season.

Personal life
Phiri hails from Alexandra and is the son of former Vaal Professionals player Esau Phiri.

Career statistics

(—) Not qualified

International

Scores and results list South Africa's goal tally first, score column indicates score after each Phiri goal.

Honours
South Africa
COSAFA Cup:2016

References

1994 births
Living people
Soccer players from Johannesburg
South African soccer players
Association football midfielders
South Africa international soccer players
Danish Superliga players
Ligue 1 players
Ligue 2 players
Süper Lig players
Brøndby IF players
En Avant Guingamp players
Çaykur Rizespor footballers
Paris FC players
South African expatriate soccer players
South African expatriate sportspeople in Denmark
Expatriate men's footballers in Denmark
South African expatriate sportspeople in France
Expatriate footballers in France
South African expatriate sportspeople in Turkey
Expatriate footballers in Turkey